Virendra Singh was an Indian politician, and a member of the Bahujan Samaj Party. He was a member of the Sixteenth Legislative Assembly of Uttar Pradesh (2012-2017) in India. He represented the Bithari Chainpur constituency.

Early life and  education 
Virendra Singh was born in Bareilly district. He attended the  Bareilly College and attained a Master of Arts degree.

Political career 
In the initial phase, he rose up from grass root level and became Block Pramukh from Bithari Chainpur, popularly called as Pramukh sahab till his landsliding victory in 2007 assembly elections. Virendra Singh has been a MLA for two terms. He represented the Bithari Chainpur constituency and is a member of the Bahujan Samaj Party political party.

He lost his seat in the 2017 Uttar Pradesh Assembly election to Rajesh Kumar Mishra "Pappu Bhartoul" of the Bharatiya Janata Party.

Posts held

See also 
 Bareilly Cantt. (Assembly constituency)
 Bithari Chainpur (Assembly constituency)
 Sixteenth Legislative Assembly of Uttar Pradesh
 Uttar Pradesh Legislative Assembly

References 

Bahujan Samaj Party politicians from Uttar Pradesh
Uttar Pradesh MLAs 2007–2012
Uttar Pradesh MLAs 2012–2017
Uttar Pradesh MLAs 2017–2022
People from Bareilly district
1959 births